Lorenza Echame Matute was an Equatoguinean politician. In 1968 she was one of the first two women elected to the National Assembly.

Biography
Of mixed race and Benga descent, in the 1968 parliamentary elections Matute was a candidate for the National Unity Movement in Corisco. She was one of two women elected to the National Assembly alongside Cristina Makoli, and subsequently she sat on the Foreign Affairs and Justice committees.

References

Date of birth unknown
Possibly living people
People of Benga descent
Equatoguinean women in politics
National Unity Movement of Equatorial Guinea politicians
Members of the Chamber of Deputies (Equatorial Guinea)